The following highways are numbered 82:

International
 Asian Highway 82
 European route E82

New Zealand
 New Zealand State Highway 82

Philippines
 N82 highway (Philippines)

South Korea
 National Route 82
Gukjido 82

United States
 Interstate 82
 Interstate 82 (Oregon–Utah) (former proposal)
 Interstate 82N (former proposal)
 Interstate 82S (Utah) (former proposal)
 Interstate 82 (Pennsylvania-New York) (former proposal)
 U.S. Route 82
 Arizona State Route 82
 Arkansas Highway 82 (1926) (former)
 California State Route 82
 Colorado State Highway 82
 Connecticut Route 82
 Delaware Route 82
 Florida State Road 82
 Georgia State Route 82
 Illinois Route 82
 Iowa Highway 82 (former)
 K-82 (Kansas highway)
 Kentucky Route 82
 Louisiana Highway 82
 Maryland Route 82 (former)
 M-82 (Michigan highway)
 Minnesota State Highway 82 (former)
 Missouri Route 82
 Montana Highway 82
 Nebraska Highway 82 (former)
 Nebraska Recreation Road 82B
 Nevada State Route 82 (former)
 New Jersey Route 82
 County Route 82 (Bergen County, New Jersey)
 New York State Route 82
 County Route 82 (Chemung County, New York)
 County Route 82 (Dutchess County, New York)
 County Route 82 (Erie County, New York)
 County Route 82 (Herkimer County, New York)
 County Route 82 (Montgomery County, New York)
 County Route 82 (Niagara County, New York)
 County Route 82 (Oneida County, New York)
 County Route 82 (Onondaga County, New York)
 County Route 82 (Suffolk County, New York)
 North Carolina Highway 82
 Ohio State Route 82
 Oklahoma State Highway 82
 Oregon Route 82
 Pennsylvania Route 82
 Tennessee State Route 82
 Texas State Highway 82
 Texas State Highway Loop 82
 Farm to Market Road 82
 Utah State Route 82
 Virginia State Route 82
 West Virginia Route 82
 Wisconsin Highway 82

Territories
 U.S. Virgin Islands Highway 82

See also
List of highways numbered 82A
A82 road